The Peace Politics People's Party (FF) was a pacifist, liberal political party in Denmark.

History
The party was founded on 16 December 1963 by a group of pacifists who opposed Danish membership of NATO. In March 1964 a Socialist People's Party MP left to join the FF, giving it parliamentary representation. In the 1964 general elections the party received just 0.4% of the vote, failing to win a seat.

The party was disbanded in the end of the 1970s.

References

Political parties established in 1963
Defunct political parties in Denmark
1963 establishments in Denmark
Liberal parties in Denmark
Pacifist parties
Defunct liberal political parties
Political parties with year of disestablishment missing